Vladimír Lengvarský (born 18 August 1969) is a Slovak general and doctor. Between April 2021 and March 2023 he served as the Minister of Health in the cabinet of Prime Minister Eduard Heger.

References

Living people
1969  births
People from Levoča
21st-century Slovak politicians
Health ministers of Slovakia